The Short Nimbus was a British two-seat glider trainer designed in 1947 by members of the Short Brothers design office, who had recently formed the Rochester Gliding Club. The company supported this venture by providing drawing-office and workshop facilities free of charge, assigning to the Nimbus one of its constructor's numbers (S.1312). The glider was registered with the British Gliding Association and given the serial number BGA470. The Nimbus was the last aircraft to be designed, built and flown from the Rochester works.

Design
The Nimbus was a wooden, two-seater, gull-wing, low-wing glider trainer. The two pilots were housed in a tandem cockpit with a perspex hood. The tailplane was attached to the fuselage immediately forward of the single tail fin. The landing gear comprised a single, central, partly recessed landing-wheel below the rear pilot and a tail-skid below the fin.

History

Although great interest was shown wherever the Nimbus was flown, only one provisional order was received, making it unviable as a commercial proposition. It took part in the SBAC's second air show in 1947 at Radlett and was placed second in the 1947 British Gliding Association's two-seater design category. After many years of service for various gliding clubs, including taking part in many competitions, it was acquired in 1985 as an exhibit by the Ulster Folk and Transport Museum in Cultra, Holywood, nr. Belfast, finally going on display in 1989 after restoration.

Operators
 
 Rochester Gliding Club
 Shorts Gliding Club, Belfast

Specifications

References

Sources

See also

1940s British sailplanes
Nimbus
Glider aircraft
1940s British sport aircraft
Gull-wing aircraft
Low-wing aircraft
Aircraft first flown in 1947